The 2013 Cavan Senior Football Championship was the 105th edition of Cavan GAA's premier club Gaelic football tournament for senior graded teams in County Cavan, Ireland. The tournament consists of 17 teams, with the winner going on to represent Cavan in the Ulster Senior Club Football Championship.

Mullahoran were the defending champions, but exited the championship to Cavan Gaels at the quarter-final stage.

Ballinagh defeated a fancied Cavan Gaels side in the final to claim their first Senior title.

Team changes
The following teams have changed division since the 2013 championship season.

To Championship
Promoted from 2012 Cavan Intermediate Football Championship
  Lacken  -  (Intermediate Champions)
  Crosserlough

Opening rounds

Preliminary rounds

Round 1

Round 2A

Back-door stage

Round 2B

Round 3

Knock-out stage

Quarter finals

Semi finals

Final

Relegation play-offs

Preliminary relegation play-off

Semi finals

Final

References

External links
 Official Cavan GAA Website

Cavan Senior Football Championship
Cavan Senior Football Championship